Lucien Fisher, sometimes spelled Lucian Fisher, was a state legislator in Florida. He represented Leon County in the Florida House of Representatives. He served in 1875.

Lucian Fisher co-signed a latter to the Freedmen's Bureau from black grocers and taught at the Concord School (Miccosukee) in 1893 and 1894.

References

Members of the Florida House of Representatives
Year of birth missing (living people)